Stephen King's F13 is a collection of casual games developed by Presto Studios and released in 1999 by Blue Byte. The title F13 suggests a function key that would follow F12 on standard PC keyboards.

Overview
The minigames include No Swimming, Bug Splat, and Whack-A-Zombie. The "Frightware" bundle also includes a set of "Screamsavers", "Bump and Thump" sound effects, "Deathtop" backgrounds, and Stephen King's short novella Everything's Eventual.

References

External links

Stephen King's F13 at GameSpot
Stephen King's F13 at Just Adventure

1999 video games
Casual games
Windows games
Classic Mac OS games
Presto Studios games
Adaptations of works by Stephen King
North America-exclusive video games
Blue Byte games
Video games developed in the United States